Corozal Junior College is a college in Belize. It was established in 1986.

References

External links

Universities in Belize
Educational institutions established in 1986
1986 establishments in Belize